Tapping is a suburb of Perth, Western Australia, located within the City of Wanneroo. It came into being in the early 1990s as a subdivision of Wanneroo, originally as part of the Carramar estate.

Tapping was chosen as the suburb name in honour of an early settler family in the Wanneroo area. William Tapping arrived in 1886 and Molly and Dolly Tapping were long time postmistresses in Wanneroo. The name for the suburb was approved in 1997.

Geography
Tapping is bounded by Joondalup Drive to the north, Pinjar Road to the east, Conti Road to the south, and Wanneroo Road to the west.

Demographics
This increase can be directly attributed to continued housing development within the suburb on previously undeveloped land previously used for farming and horticulture activities. The median age of Tapping residents was 30, and median individual incomes were $831 per week. 0.8% of the population identified themselves as Indigenous persons.

The most common religious affiliation was "No Religion" (25.3%}; the next most common responses were Anglican (23.7%), Catholic (22.0%), and Uniting Church (3.6%).

Education
Tapping contains one private school, St Stephen's School, Carramar Campus, an extension of the original St Stephens School in Duncraig. The school supports both primary and secondary education.
Tapping also has two public schools: Tapping Primary School, which opened at the start of 2007, and Spring Hill Primary School, which opened in 2011. Both schools provide education from Kindergarten through to Year 6.

Tapping does not contain a public high school. High school studies are provided through Wanneroo Senior High School and Kinross College.

Transport 
The suburb is served by bus routes which provide connections to the Joondalup Line via either the Whitfords or Joondalup railway stations.

Bus routes
 390 Joondalup Station - Banksia Grove. Operates east-west along Clarkson Avenue and Yandella Promenade.
 467 Whitfords Station - Joondalup Station. Operates north-south along Waldburg Drive.
 468 Whitfords Station - Joondalup Station. Operates north-south along Wanneroo Road.

References

Suburbs of Perth, Western Australia
Suburbs of the City of Wanneroo